Larchamp may refer to the following places in France:

 Larchamp, Mayenne, a commune in the Mayenne department
 Larchamp, Orne, a commune in the Orne department